Margaret Seymour Carpenter (April 3, 1893 - March 30, 1987) was the writer of the novel Experiment Perilous (Boston: Little Brown & Co., 1943), a New York Times Bestseller in 1943. The novel was produced by RKO Radio Pictures as a film of the same name, Experiment Perilous, starring Hedy Lamarr, George Brent, and Paul Lukas. She was the daughter of George Rice Carpenter and his wife Mary Seymour.  She married on May 2, 1916 in New York City to Henry Barber Richardson of Boston, Massachusetts.

Carpenter died March 30, 1987 in Boston, Massachusetts.

References

1893 births
1987 deaths
Writers from Boston
Writers from New York City
American women novelists
20th-century American novelists
20th-century American women writers
Novelists from Massachusetts
Novelists from New York (state)
Rehoboth Carpenter family